Meydavud District is a district (bakhsh) in Bagh-e Malek County, Khuzestan Province, Iran. At the 2006 census, its population was 18,588, in 3,758 families.  The District has one city Meydavud. The District has two rural districts (dehestan): Meydavud Rural District and Saroleh Rural District.

References 

Bagh-e Malek County
Districts of Khuzestan Province